Aleksander Buksa (born 15 January 2003) is a Polish professional footballer who plays as a forward for Belgian club SL 16 FC, on loan from Genoa.

Club career

Wisła Kraków
Buksa was promoted to the Wisła Kraków A team on 6 February 2019.He made his professional debut for the club on 22 April 2019 in a 2-3 league loss to Wisla Plock.He scored his first goal for the club against Jagiellonia Białystok in the league on 23 August 2019. The player, who made a name for himself with his successful performance and goals, attracted attention.

Genoa
On 1 July 2021, he moved from Wisła Kraków to Italian Serie A club Genoa, as his contract with the Polish side had expired. Buksa made his debut on 29 August 2021 in the league match against Napoli as a substitute in the 46th minute.

OH Leuven
On 22 August 2022, Buksa joined Belgian club OH Leuven on a season-long loan. Two weeks later, Buksa was an unused substitute in a 2–2 away draw at Anderlecht which would be his only selection for OH Leuven. He would only go on to appear 16 times and score 5 goals for the OH Leuven U23 team, which was playing at the third level of Belgian football. On 27 January 2023, OH Leuven announced the loan deal had been terminated by mutual consent.

SL 16 FC
On 29 January 2023, Standard Liège announced Buksa would be joining their second division reserve side until the end of the season. Later that day, he scored the opening goal in a 2–2 home draw against S.K. Beveren.

International career
Buksa has been capped at youth level for Poland.

Personal life
Buksa is the brother of Polish professional footballer Adam Buksa, who plays for Lens.

Career statistics

Club

References

External links
 
Footballdatabase Profile
 

2003 births
Living people
Footballers from Kraków
Polish footballers
Poland youth international footballers
Poland under-21 international footballers
Association football forwards
Wisła Kraków players
Genoa C.F.C. players
Oud-Heverlee Leuven players
Ekstraklasa players
Serie A players
Belgian National Division 1 players
Challenger Pro League players
Polish expatriate footballers
Polish expatriate sportspeople in Italy
Expatriate footballers in Italy
Polish expatriate sportspeople in Belgium
Expatriate footballers in Belgium